Detelinara (from Serbian detelina - clover, hence Detelinara = Field of Clovers) is an urban neighborhood of the city of Novi Sad, Serbia.

Borders

The south-eastern borders of Detelinara are Ulica Branka Bajića (Branko Bajić Street) and Ulica Braće Popović (Braće Popović Street), the north-eastern border is Rumenačka ulica (Rumenačka Street), the northern border is Ulica Oblačića Rada (Oblačića Rada Street), and the western border is Bulevar Evrope (Boulevard of Europe), built in the last quarter of 2009.

Neighbouring city quarters
The neighbouring city quarters are: Novo Naselje and Jugovićevo in the west, Avijatičarsko Naselje in the north, Sajmište in the south-east, and Banatić and Industrijska Zona Jug in the north-east.

Parts of Detelinara
Detelinara is divided into Stara Detelinara (Old Detelinara) and Nova Detelinara (New Detelinara). The border between these two parts of the settlement is Ulica Kornelija Stankovića (Kornelije Stanković Street). Old Detelinara is located on the southern side of this Street, while New Detelinara is located on the northern side. But due to rapid construction of new apartment buildings on the southern side in practice, southern side is called New and northern Old.

Sports
The FK Novi Sad stadium holds 6.000 people.

History
Between 1980 and 1989, Detelinara was one of the seven municipalities of Novi Sad City. The municipality included the city quarters of Detelinara, Sajmište, Banatić, Avijatičarsko Naselje, Jugovićevo, Industrijska Zona Jug, Industrijska Zona Sever, Gornje Livade and Rimski Šančevi, and the villages of Rumenka, Kisač, and Stepanovićevo.

During bombing of Novi Sad in 1999, NATO bombs devastated civilian residential buildings and a school in Detelinara.

Gallery

See also
 Neighborhoods of Novi Sad

References

 Jovan Mirosavljević, Brevijar ulica Novog Sada 1745-2001, Novi Sad, 2002.
 Milorad Grujić, Vodič kroz Novi Sad i okolinu, Novi Sad, 2004.

External links

 Nova Detelinara (in Serbian)
 U šetnji Detelinarom (in Serbian)
 Images of NATO bombing in 1999 in Detelinara
 Graffiti in Detelinara
 Detailed map of Novi Sad and Detelinara

Novi Sad neighborhoods